Haruzo Hida (肥田 晴三 Hida Haruzo, born 6 August 1952, Sakai, Osaka) is a Japanese mathematician, known for his research in number theory, algebraic geometry, and modular forms.

Hida received from Kyoto University a B.A. in 1975, an M.A. in 1977, and a Ph.D. in 1980 with thesis On Abelian Varieties with Complex Multiplication as Factors of the Jacobians of Shimura Curves, although he left Kyoto University in 1977. He was from 1977 to 1984 an assistant professor and from 1984 to 1987 an associate professor at Hokkaidō University. Since 1987 he has been a professor at the University of California, Los Angeles. From 1979 to 1981 he was a visiting scholar at the Institute for Advanced Study.

Hida was an invited speaker at the International Congress of Mathematicians (Berkeley) in 1986. In 1991 he was awarded the Guggenheim Fellowship. Hida received in 1992 for his research on p-adic L-functions of algebraic groups and p-adic Hecke rings the Spring Prize of the Mathematical Society of Japan. In 2012 he was elected a Fellow of the American Mathematical Society. He received the 2019 Leroy P. Steele Prize for Seminal Contribution to Research for his highly original paper "Galois representations into GL2(Zp) attached to ordinary cusp forms," published in 1986 in Inventiones Mathematicae.

Selected works
 Elementary theory of L-functions and Eisenstein series, Cambridge University Press, 1993
 Modular forms and Galois cohomology, Cambridge University Press, 2000
 Geometric modular forms and elliptic curves, World Scientific, 2000
 p-Adic automorphic forms on Shimura varieties, Springer, 2004
 Hilbert modular forms and Iwasawa theory, Oxford University Press, 2006

External links
 Homepage for Haruzo Hida at UCLA

References

20th-century Japanese mathematicians
21st-century Japanese mathematicians
Number theorists
Kyoto University alumni
Academic staff of Hokkaido University
University of California, Los Angeles faculty
1952 births
Living people
Fellows of the American Mathematical Society